Karina Stowers (née Penetito; born 2 February 1986) is a New Zealand rugby union player. She played for   internationally and provincially for Auckland.

Rugby career 
Stowers made her test debut for New Zealand aged 19, on 29 June 2005 against Scotland at Ottawa.

Stowers was part of the Black Ferns squad that won the 2010 Rugby World Cup. She toured England with the Black Ferns in 2012. She featured in the first test which they lost 13–16 at Esher.

In 2013, Stowers was named in the Black Ferns squad that faced England in three test matches. They clinched the series after beating the Red Roses 14–9 in the second test.

Personal life 
In December 2011, she married New Zealand sevens representative and former Blues winger Sherwin Stowers.

References

External links
 Black Ferns Profile

1986 births
Living people
New Zealand women's international rugby union players
New Zealand female rugby union players